ATLA: All This Life Allows, Vol. 1 is the second studio album by American rapper Stat Quo. The album was released on February 25, 2014, under his independent label ATLA Music.  It was preceded by Stat Quo's first studio album Statlanta (2010). The album's production was handled by DeUno, Amir Perry, A.O., Steve Esterfern, Ty Cutta, Bink, LT Moe, Tone Mason and Dr. Dre.  It also features guest appearances from Stoney Brown, Sha Sha, Dre (of Cool & Dre), Scarface and Devin the Dude. The album was promoted by four singles: "Michael", "Trillion" featuring Dre, "OutKast" and "That's Life, Pt. 1".

Singles
On September 9, 2013, Stat Quo released the first single "Michael" (a tribute to Michael Jordan, Mike Tyson, & Michael Jackson) and confirmed it to appears as a bonus track. It was produced by Tone Mason.

On December 16, 2013, the second single titled "Trillion" was released. It features Dre from production duo Cool & Dre and was produced by Tone Mason who also produced "Michael", the album's lead single.

On December 20, 2013, "OutKast" was released as the third single. The song was produced by DeUno and  pays homage to Atlanta rap group Outkast.

Stat Quo released the album opener "That's Life, Pt. 1" as the album's fourth single on January 6, 2014.  The single was produced by Bink.

Track listing

References

2014 albums
Stat Quo albums
Albums produced by Bink (record producer)
Albums produced by Dr. Dre
Albums produced by Tone Mason